São Félix do Xingu is a municipality in the state of Pará in the Northern region of Brazil.

The city is served by São Félix do Xingu Airport.

Conservation

The municipality contains part of the  Tapirapé Biological Reserve, a strictly protected conservation unit created in 1989.
It contains part of the Tapirapé-Aquiri National Forest, a  sustainable use conservation unit created in 1989.
It also contains part of the  Terra do Meio Ecological Station, a strictly protected conservation unit created in 2005.
The municipality contains 51% of the  Serra do Pardo National Park, also created in 2005.

See also
List of municipalities in Pará

References

Municipalities in Pará